Philippa Fisher and the Dream Maker's Daughter is a children's fantasy novel written by Liz Kessler, author of the Emily Windsnap series, and illustrated by Katie May. It is the second book in the Philippa Fisher series, the first sequel to Philippa Fisher's Fairy Godsister (2008). It was published May 2009 in the UK by Orion Books. Candlewick Press published a US edition later that year.

Plot summary

Philippa Fisher is lonely. She misses her fairy godsister, Daisy. While on vacation with her parents, she befriends a local girl, Robyn. Though she is excited to have a friend again, she cannot help feeling there is something strange about Robyn and her father.

Meanwhile, Daisy, who is hard at work on a new mission, misses Philippa as well, so she decides to break the rules and visit her friend. The girls are happy to be reunited, but things soon begin to go horribly wrong with Daisy's assignment. When all three girls find themselves in danger, Philippa must work quickly to save her friends and herself.

References

External links
 Philippa Fisher and the Dream Maker's Daughter at Fantastic Fiction
  
  

2009 British novels
Children's fantasy novels
British children's novels
British fantasy novels
2009 children's books
Orion Books books